Loredana Zisu (born 16 January 1979) is a Romanian butterfly and freestyle swimmer. She competed in four events at the 1996 Summer Olympics, with a best finish of seventh in the women's 4 × 200 metre freestyle relay.

References

External links
 

1979 births
Living people
Romanian female butterfly swimmers
Romanian female freestyle swimmers
Olympic swimmers of Romania
Swimmers at the 1996 Summer Olympics
Sportspeople from Galați